Khalifa is an Arabic name or title which means "successor", "deputy" or "steward".
 Caliph, the ruler of a Caliphate
 Khalifa (Morocco), a high official in the Sultanate of Morocco

Khalifa may also refer to:

Arts, entertainment, and media
 Khalifa (film), a 1976 Bollywood film
 Khalifa (album), a 2016 album by Wiz Khalifa

Buildings
 Burj Khalifa, a supertall skyscraper in Dubai, United Arab Emirates, currently the tallest building in the world
 Khalifa International Stadium, a multi-purpose stadium in Doha, Qatar

People
 Al Khalifa (House of Khalifa), the royal family of Bahrain
 Khalifa (mansa), the fourth mansa of the Mali Empire
 Abdel Qawi Khalifa, Egyptian engineer and academic
 Mia Khalifa (born 1993), Lebanese-American social media personality and webcam model and former pornographic actress
 Wiz Khalifa (born 1987), American rapper

Places
 Khalifa City, a residential suburb in Abu Dhabi, United Arab Emirates
 Khalifa Port, a port in Abu Dhabi, United Arab Emirates
 Khalifa Point, Balochistan, Pakistan, a town
 Xəlfəlikənd, Lerik, Azerbaijan, a village
 Khalifeh (disambiguation), multiple places in Iran

Other uses
 Khalifa Airways, a former Algerian company
 Khalifa (caste), a Muslim group based in Gujarat, India

See also
 Khalifah (film), a 2011 Indonesian film by Nurman Hakim
 Khalifah ibn Khayyat (777–854), Arab historian
 Kalifa (disambiguation)